Dorothy is an unincorporated community and census-designated place located in Weymouth Township in Atlantic County, New Jersey, United States. The area is served as United States Postal Service ZIP code 08317.

As of the 2010 United States census, the population for ZIP Code Tabulation Area 08317 was 1,344.

Demographics

Notable people

People who were born in, residents of, or otherwise closely associated with Dorothy include:
 Frances Edelstein (1926–2018), businesswoman who ran the Cafe Edison in New York City's Theater District, together with her husband
Kathleen Karr (1946–2017), young adult and children's novelist.
 Rhoda Scott (born 1938), soul jazz organist and singer

References

Census-designated places in Atlantic County, New Jersey
Census-designated places in New Jersey
Unincorporated communities in Atlantic County, New Jersey
Unincorporated communities in New Jersey
Weymouth Township, New Jersey